The Human Rights Party was a Cambodian political party founded on 22 July 2007 by Kem Sokha. Critics allege that its foundation is meant to weaken opposition parties and is driven by the ruling party. This sentiment, however, seems to be driven by the ruling party themselves as Kem Sokha has long been a very vocal critic of the ruling Cambodian People's Party. At the time of its foundation, the party claimed to have between 200,000 and 500,000 members nationwide.

Human Rights Party is the first party in Cambodia to adopt the check and balance system, changing the culture of one-man-ruling parties,
which most parties in Cambodia adopt. It is also the first party in Cambodia to have its major leaders elected in its convention. Its popularity has been dramatically increasing in Cambodia, especially in the countryside.

In the July 2008 parliamentary elections, the ruling party won a landslide majority, and the Human Rights Party took third place.

In 2012, it merged with the Sam Rainsy Party to form the Cambodia National Rescue Party.

Electoral performance

General election

Communal election

References

External links
HRP website (Khmer, French, English)
Habeas-Corpus.net, a pro Justice and Democracy web publishes a page in English and Spanish on Cambodia

2007 establishments in Cambodia
Cambodian democracy movements
Liberal parties in Cambodia
Nationalist parties in Cambodia
Political parties disestablished in 2018
Political parties established in 2007